Rabbi Simcha Mordechai Zissel Ziskind Broide (1912  21 April 2000) served 40 years as Rosh Yeshiva of Yeshiva Knesses Yisroel Chevron, beginning with his appointment in 5721 (1960/61). He also authored a sefer named VeSam Derech.

Biography
Simcha Zissel was born to Rabbi Chizkiyahu Avrohom in Jerusalem in the month of Adar 5672 (1912).

He was not in Chevron the day of the 1929 massacre.

He died on 21 April 2000 (16 Nisan), the day before Shabbos Chol HaMoed Pesach (age 88). Despite religious prohibitions for eulogies during the holiday except for great scholars, "a huge throng estimated by police to be around 100,000, headed by Maran HaRav Yosef Sholom Eliashiv," did so Sunday morning, one of the intermediary days.

Eight years later he was described as "one of the great mussar educators of our generation."

References

1912 births
Date of birth missing
2000 deaths
20th-century rabbis in Jerusalem
Place of death missing
Israeli Rosh yeshivas